The Libyan International Medical University (Arabic: الجامعة الليبية الدولية للعلوم الطبية) is a private university established in Benghazi, Libya, with the purpose of teaching medicine. It is the first private medical university in Libya.

Its doors were opened to enrolled students on October 15, 2007. According to university references, over 200 students had enrolled under its faculties:

 Faculty of Basic Medical Sciences
 Faculty of Medicine
 Faculty of Dentistry
 Faculty of Pharmacy
 Faculty of Information Technology
 Faculty of Nursing

One of the university's major points is its focus on international partnerships and meeting the level of other international medical teaching institutes. The teaching policy emulates those of many established universities and is mainly problem-based learning.

The National Quality Assurance committee of Libya visited all the universities to evaluate them on two bases: facilities and program. The Libyan International Medical University attained a very advanced position in this evaluation in both aspects.

The Libyan Ministry of Health granted LIMU students the privilege of training at the national health care centers and hospitals.

Problem-based learning
Since the establishment of LIMU, a clear objective was to use the problem-based learning (PBL) system. In 2009, with the enrollment of its third batch, this system was implemented from their first semester. LIMU is the only medical university in Libya that uses this modern system and one of the handful of universities in the Arab world.

A number of researches had shown that the PBL was more effective than traditional methods of teaching medicine. Overall, it was found to promote integration of concepts in addition to increasing the skill of students with patients.

References

External links
 LIMU University Website The Libyan International Medical University (LIMU) homepage (English)

Benghazi
Universities in Libya
Medical schools in Libya
Educational institutions established in 2007
2007 establishments in Libya